Maurice Thomson (1601/04–1676), of St Andrew's parish, Eastcheap, City of London and of Haversham in Buckinghamshire, was an English merchant, slave trader and Puritan, said to be "England's greatest colonial merchant of his day". He obtained a monopoly of the Virginia tobacco trade.

He was the eldest son and heir of Robert Thomson of Watton-at-Stone, Hertfordshire, by his wife Elizabeth Harsflet, daughter of John Harsflet (alias Halfehead, Harsnett) of Watton-at-Stone. His sister Mary Thomson married William Tucker, a merchant and one of the first plantation owners in the Colony of Virginia. His younger brothers included Col. George Thomson (c. 1607 – 1691), a merchant, Parliamentarian soldier and MP for Southwark; Robert Thomson, youngest brother, who was also a merchant; Paul Thomson and Sir William Thomson.

In the early 1650s, Thomson and business associate Rowland Wilson had engaged James Pope to act as agent on their ship Friendship, for a number of slaving voyages to Gambia. Dresser quotes them as instructing Pope to, along with loading the ship with African slaves for Barbados, "find 15 or 20 many lusty young Negers and bring them home with you for London".

Thomson married Dorothy Vaux, daughter of John Vaux, of Pembrokeshire, by whom he had children including John Thompson, 1st Baron Haversham (c. 1648 – 1710), eldest son and heir; and Mary Thomson, who became the wife of William Owfield (1623–1664), MP.

He owned estates and property including Elsham, Lincolnshire, which manor he purchased in 1655, and Worcester House, Mile End Green, which he sold in 1675 to the Church. He died in 1676 and was buried in the chancel of Haversham Church.

References

Sources
Brenner, Robert, Merchants and Revolution: Commercial Change, Political Conflict, and London's Overseas Traders, 1550-1653, 2003; 
McCartney, Martha W., Virginia Immigrants and Adventurers, 1607-1635: A Biographical Dictionary
Richard B. Sheridan, Sugar and Slavery: An Economic History of the British West Indies, 1623-1775, pp. 88–90 
Biographical details: ancestry.com 
John Burke, Sir Bernard Burke, A Genealogical and Heraldic History of the Extinct and Dormant Baronetcies, p. 523 

1676 deaths
English merchants
People from Watton-at-Stone
Year of birth uncertain
English slave traders
Ship owners